Ramree or Ramarwaddy also known as Yanbye is a town in Kyaukpyu District, Rakhine State, Myanmar. Ramree (locally pronounced Ram Bray) is situated on Ramree Island. Ramree is the capital of the township of the same name and former capital of the district of Ramree (until 1852 ). The population of Ramree (Yanbye) Urban area is 9,581 as of 2014, while Ramree Township's population is 97,891.

Etymology
The name "Ramree" (ရမ်းဗြဲ) is derived from the former name of island: Ramarwaddy (ရမ္မာဝတီ) which meant Pleasant Region (Rammar= Pleasant) (Wati = Region). The administrative town of Rammar Wati was called "Rammar Wati Pri Myo" and then acronymic way, town's name was shorten to Ram Pri Myo (ရမ်ပြည်မြို့) which was heard by Portuguese firstly landed Europeans to this town as Rama Ree or Rama Ri later it was noted as Ramri or Ramree.

History
During the existence of the kingdom of Arakan, it was the site of a Governor of the island and then it was also called Tan-Myo (name that subsequently subsisted Tan river locally). Under Burmese dominion it was conserved as the capital of a district, but called Yan-bai-myo or Yanbyemyo (abbreviated Yanbye) while the Arakans called it Ran-Breh-myo, abbreviated Ran-breh, from which its current name derives, Corruption of this word for Europeans. At the beginning of the 19th century it was a prosperous city with an intense trade with Bengal, Vasai and Tavoy ; but a few years later he suffered seriously during the rebellion of Khyin-Bran (Chinbryan, King Bering) since 1811, and the repressive measures of the Burmese; Khyin-Bran had many supporters in the city and after his defeat and death in 1815 a large number of inhabitants were assassinated or forced to flee the country. In the first Anglo-Burmese War the city was occupied without fighting for the forces of General MacBean, when it had already been evacuated by the Burmese; After the formal annexation of Arakan in 1826 at the end of the war, Ramree was declared a capital of the district of Ramree, until 1852 when the districts of An and Ramree were united and the capital of the new district passed to Kyaukpyu that from 1838 was a capital. The population in 1853 was estimated to have 9,000 inhabitants, three-fourths of Arakana, but the loss of capitalism made it lower in importance and in 1877 it appears with only 4,028 inhabitants; The census of 1881 was 3,461.

Bibliography

References

External links 
 19° 5' 0" North, 93° 52' 0" East Satellite map at Maplandia.com

Populated places in Rakhine State
Township capitals of Myanmar